Slavibor was a Sorbian prince, and father of the Czech saint Ludmila.

References

9th-century Slavs
894 deaths
Early Sorbian people
Year of birth unknown
9th-century Bohemian people